Slow Burn or Slowburn may refer to:

Film and television
 Slow Burn (1986 film) by Matthew Chapman starring Eric Roberts and Johnny Depp
 Slow Burn (1989 film) by John Eyres starring William Smith,  Anthony James and Ivan Rogers  
 Slow Burn (2000 film) by Christian Ford starring Minnie Driver, James Spader and Josh Brolin
 Slow Burn (2005 film) by Wayne Beach starring Ray Liotta, Jolene Blalock and LL Cool J
Slow Burn, a 2020 documentary series on Epix based on the TV adaptation of the Slow Burn podcast

Music

Bands 
 Slowburn (band)
Slo Burn, a stoner band

Albums 
 Slow Burn (Mel Parsons album), 2022
 Slow Burn (Sev Statik album), 2005
 Slow to Burn, 1996 album by Vanessa Daou

Songs 
 "Slow Burn" (Atreyu song), 2007
 "Slow Burn" (David Bowie song), 2002
 "Slow Burn" (T.G. Sheppard song), 1983
 "Slow Burn", 2018 song by Kacey Musgraves on the album Golden Hour
 "Slow Burn", 2022 title song by the Mel Parsons on the album Slow Burn
 "Slow Burn", 1994 song by the Screamin' Cheetah Wheelies
 "Slow Burn", 2016 song by Tim Hicks from Shake These Walls
 "Slow Burn", 2021 song by Wage War from Manic
 "Slowburn" (Corey Hart song), 1990
 "Slowburn" (Peter Gabriel song), 1977
 "Slowburn", 2014 song by Code Orange from I Am King
 "Slowburn", 2005 song by Rev Theory (formerly known as Revelation Theory)

Podcasts 
Slow Burn (2017 podcast) hosted by Leon Neyfakh